DJ-Kicks: Hot Chip is a DJ mix album, mixed by Hot Chip. It was released on the Studio !K7 independent record label as part of the DJ-Kicks series on May 22, 2007. It features a new song by Hot Chip, "My Piano".

Background
In an interview with Pitchfork Media, Alexis Taylor said that some of Hot Chip's main influences weren't represented on the album because they wanted to create an album that would be "an interesting experience for people to listen to at home" and not "Hot Chip's Biggest Influences CD". In terms of the band's song choices, Owen Clarke was the least vocal in the song selection, whilst Joe Goddard and Felix Martin "lead the proceedings". Taylor said that parts of the album included artists that all the members of Hot Chip appreciated, such as  Grovesnor, Ray Charles and New Order.

Taylor felt "it would've been nice for [the song "Radio Prague"] to take up a little bit more room" as his purpose in choosing it was to "change the mood at that point in the record", but felt the song seemed "a little buried".

Before Hot Chip began work on DJ-Kicks: Hot Chip, "My Piano" was created. The lyrics of the verses are about "accepting failure when you're trying to write or create something", with piano elements inspired by Diana Ross', "My Old Piano".

Track listing
 "Nitemoves" - Grovesnor
 "I Got a Man" - Positive K
 "Like You" - Gramme
 "Persuasion" - Subway
 "B1" - Soundhack
 "Cademar" - Tom Zé
 "My Piano" - Hot Chip
 "Short Road" - Wax Stag
 "Bizarre Love Triangle [Shep Pettibone extended remix]" - New Order
 "Jiggle It" - Young Leek
 "In the Basement" - Etta James & Sugar Pie DeSanto
 "On Just Foot" - Black Devil Disco Club
 "Der Buchdrucker" - Dominik Eulberg
 "Film 2" - Grauzone
 "Radio Prague" - This Heat
 "Far East" - Wookie
 "Doppelwhipper [live]" - Gabriel Ananda
 "You Got Good Ash" - Marek Bois
 "Stone That the Builder Rejected" - Lanark
 "Man's Got Me Beat" - UM
 "Love Affair" - Noze
 "Just Fucking [Roman Flügel's 23 Positions in a One-Night Stand remix]" - Audion
 "Steppin' Out" - Joe Jackson
 "Mess Around" - Ray Charles

References

External links 
DJ-Kicks website

Hot Chip
Hot Chip albums
2007 compilation albums